Tricholoma intermedium is a mushroom of the agaric genus Tricholoma. It was formally described by American mycologist Charles Horton Peck in 1888.

See also
List of North American Tricholoma
List of Tricholoma species

References

intermedium
Fungi described in 1888
Fungi of North America
Taxa named by Charles Horton Peck